H. C. S. Motor Car Company Building, also known as S. Cohn & Son Inc. and Capital View, is a historic industrial / commercial building located at Indianapolis, Indiana.  It was designed by Rubush & Hunter and built in 1920-1921 for its namesake, the H. C. S. Motor Car Company.  It is a four-story, rectangular Classical Revival style, reinforced concrete building. It has buff-colored brick curtain walls. It was originally built to house an automobile assembler, supplier, and showroom. The building was renovated for office usage between 2005 and 2007.

It was listed on the National Register of Historic Places in 2009.

References

Industrial buildings and structures on the National Register of Historic Places in Indiana
Commercial buildings on the National Register of Historic Places in Indiana
Neoclassical architecture in Indiana
Industrial buildings completed in 1921
Commercial buildings completed in 1921
Buildings and structures in Indianapolis
National Register of Historic Places in Indianapolis